FP (short for functional programming) is a programming language created by John Backus to support the function-level programming paradigm. It allows building programs from a set of generally useful primitives and avoiding named variables (a style also called tacit programming or "point free"). It was heavily influenced by APL which was developed by Kenneth E. Iverson in the early 1960s.

The FP language was introduced in Backus's 1977 Turing Award paper, "Can Programming Be Liberated from the von Neumann Style?", subtitled "a functional style and its algebra of programs."  The paper sparked interest in functional programming research, eventually leading to modern functional languages, which are largely founded on the lambda calculus paradigm, and not the function-level paradigm Backus had hoped. In his Turing award paper, Backus described how the FP style is different:

FP itself never found much use outside of academia. In the 1980s Backus created a successor language, FL, which was an internal project at IBM Research.

Overview 

The values that FP programs map into one another comprise a set which is closed under sequence formation:

 if x1,...,xn are values, then the sequence 〈x1,...,xn〉 is also a value

These values can be built from any set of atoms: booleans, integers, reals, characters, etc.:
 boolean   : {T, F}
 integer   : {0,1,2,...,∞}
 character : {'a','b','c',...}
 symbol    : {x,y,...}

⊥ is the undefined value, or bottom. Sequences are bottom-preserving:

 〈x1,...,⊥,...,xn〉  =  ⊥

FP programs are functions f that each map a single value x into another:

 f:x represents the value that results from applying the function f 
     to the value x

Functions are either primitive (i.e., provided with the FP environment) or are built from the primitives by program-forming operations (also called functionals).

An example of primitive function is constant, which transforms a value x into the constant-valued function x̄. Functions are strict:
 f:⊥ = ⊥

Another example of a primitive function is the selector function family, denoted by 1,2,... where:
 i:〈x1,...,xn〉  =  xi  if  1 ≤ i ≤ n
               =  ⊥   otherwise

Functionals

In contrast to primitive functions, functionals operate on other functions.  For example, some functions have a unit value, such as 0 for addition and 1 for multiplication. The functional unit produces such a value when applied to a function f that has one:
 unit +   =  0
 unit ×   =  1
 unit foo =  ⊥

These are the core functionals of FP:

 composition  f∘g        where    f∘g:x = f:(g:x)

 construction [f1,...,fn] where   [f1,...,fn]:x =  〈f1:x,...,fn:x〉

 condition (h ⇒ f;g)    where   (h ⇒ f;g):x   =  f:x   if   h:x  =  T
                                              =  g:x   if   h:x  =  F
                                              =  ⊥    otherwise

 apply-to-all  αf       where   αf:〈x1,...,xn〉  = 〈f:x1,...,f:xn〉

 insert-right  /f       where   /f:〈x〉             =  x
                        and     /f:〈x1,x2,...,xn〉  =  f:〈x1,/f:〈x2,...,xn〉〉
                        and     /f:〈 〉             =  unit f

 insert-left  \f       where   \f:〈x〉             =  x
                       and     \f:〈x1,x2,...,xn〉  =  f:〈\f:〈x1,...,xn-1〉,xn〉
                       and     \f:〈 〉             =  unit f

Equational functions

In addition to being constructed from primitives by functionals, a function may be defined recursively by an equation, the simplest kind being:
 f ≡ Ef
where Ef is an expression built from primitives, other defined functions, and the function symbol f itself, using functionals.

FP84
FP84 is an extension of FP to include infinite sequences, programmer-defined combining forms (analogous to those that Backus himself added to FL, his successor to FP), and lazy evaluation. Unlike FFP, another one of Backus' own variations on FP, FP84 makes a clear distinction between objects and functions: i.e., the latter are no longer represented by sequences of the former. FP84's extensions are accomplished by removing the FP restriction that sequence construction be applied only to non-⊥ objects: in FP84 the entire universe of expressions (including those whose meaning is ⊥) is closed under sequence construction.

FP84's semantics are embodied in an underlying algebra of programs, a set of function-level equalities that may be used to manipulate and reason about programs.

References

Sacrificing simplicity for convenience: Where do you draw the line?, John H. Williams and Edward L. Wimmers, IBM Almaden Research Center, Proceedings of the FIfteenth Annual ACM SIGACT-SIGPLAN Symposium on Principles of Programming Languages, San Diego, CA, January 1988.

External links
 Interactive FP (requires Java), Help page
 FP-Interpreter written in Delphi/Lazarus
 Dirk Gerrits: Turing Award lecture (1977-1978) ff, in John W. Backus (Publications)
 FP84 vs FL: Sacrificing simplicity for convenience: Where do you draw the line? J.H. William and E.L. Wimmers, 1988 (Pages 169–179)
Academic programming languages
Function-level languages
Programming languages created in 1977